Frank W. Gaskill (born January 11, 1969) is an American psychologist and author who specializes in autism spectrum disorder (ASD), effective parenting, and children can function with technology successfully. With David A. Verhaagen, Gaskill co-founded a private psychology practice in Charlotte, North Carolina called Southeast Psychological Services. It later became known as Southeast Psych.

Gaskill is the co-author of a graphic novel about life on the spectrum. In addition to having a comic based on autism, he is also the host of an online video series dedicated to promoting the idea that autism is a sign of a more highly evolved brain. This show is called, "The Dr. G Aspie Show." and is also viewable on Psychbytes.com

Education and experience
Gaskill received his B.A., M.A., and PhD in Psychology and School Psychology from the University of North Carolina at Chapel Hill. Prior to founding Southeast Psych, he worked at The Devereux Foundation in Devon, Pennsylvania, serving as their Primary Therapist and Senior Research Psychologist for the Institute for Clinical Training and Research (ICTR).

Books and media appearances 
Gaskill is the co-author of Max Gamer, a graphic novel about autism. The novel focuses on strengths, which help autistic children to develop the resilience and confidence they need to rise to their potential. Other books he authored or co-authored are - the Travis Langley Popular Culture Psychology series, and How We Built Our Dream Practice: Innovative Ideas for Building Yours with David A. Verhaagen. 

Their core values of Fun, Innovation, Relationship, and Excellence (FIRE) influenced Gaskill and Verhaagen in building their large private practice therapy clinic. Gaskill was a panelist at Comicon San Diego for his work with Max Gamer. His work has been featured in USA Today, NPR, and other media outlets.

Gaskill does about 15 presentations/conferences per year across the southeast on autism, "E-parenting," and other related topics.

Notes

External links
 http://www.fatcatpsych.com (Dr. Gaskill's biography)

1969 births
Living people
21st-century American psychologists
20th-century American psychologists